Argemone platyceras, the chicalote, is a species of flowering plant in the family Papaveraceae. It is native to seasonally dry areas of Mexico, and has been introduced to Uzbekistan. There appears to be a cultivar, 'Silver Charm'.

References

platyceras
Endemic flora of Mexico
Plants described in 1829